Meols is a Metropolitan Borough of Sefton ward in the Southport Parliamentary constituency that covers the localities of Churchtown and Crossens in the north end of the town of Southport. The population of this ward taken at the 2011 census was 12,425.

Councillors

Election results

Elections of the 2010s

References

Wards of the Metropolitan Borough of Sefton
Southport